Andreas Morczinietz (born March 11, 1978) is a German professional ice hockey player. He is currently playing for Hannover Scorpions in the Deutsche Eishockey Liga (DEL).

Career statistics

Regular season and playoffs

International

References

External links

1978 births
Living people
German ice hockey right wingers
Hannover Scorpions players
Olympic ice hockey players of Germany
People from Wolfratshausen
Sportspeople from Upper Bavaria